The Xiaolin Pingpu Cultural Museum is a museum in Jiaxian District, Kaohsiung, Taiwan.

History
The museum was officially opened in 1996. In August 2009, it was destroyed by Typhoon Morakot. It was then rebuilt afterwards with a cost of NT$280 million. The reconstruction work was completed in 2012.

Architecture
The museum building spans over an area of 6,453 m2. It is housed in a two-story building with a theme of earth-terrace house. Its roof is decorated with straws and its wall is decorated with bamboos.

Exhibitions
The museum displays various aspects about the plain indigenous people of Taiwan. It exhibits the traditional agriculture and hunting methods of the indigenous people. It also features the history of the rebuilding efforts of the local community after the 2009 Typhoon Morakot.

See also
 List of museums in Taiwan

References

1996 establishments in Taiwan
Museums established in 1996
Museums in Kaohsiung